The Wickersdorf Free School Community was a progressive school in Germany, founded by Gustav Wyneken and Paul Geheeb in 1906.

In particular, the concept of "movement play" on the school stage can be understood as the original contribution of the Freie Schulgemeinde to a school culture of movement and physical culture, which continues to have an impact on the subject of performing play today. This concept, which goes back to Martin Luserke, was both theoretically elaborated and practically tested by him over decades.

Pedagogy 

Wyneken, who had previously taught at a Hermann Lietz school, modeled Wickersdorf on his experimental, neo-Idealist ideas: to treat children as distinct from adults, to pique natural curiosity, to let the child's natural abilities appear gradually, to teach through experience rather than academics. Unlike other experiemntal schools, Wickersdorf focused on humanities, centering the school on finding the "objective spirit" in philosophy, literature, and music.

Legacy 

Music theorist Ernst Kurth's year as Wickersdorf's head music instructor was a pivotal moment in his life, with the influence of August Halm and Wyneken.

Wickersdorf co-founder Martin Luserke continued on to found Schule am Meer in 1925, and Wickersdorf teacher  continued to found another school in 1919, both with music pedagogy they had learned from August Halm at Wickersdorf.

See also 

 Alexander Schwab
 Ulrich Becher
 Hans Hess (museologist)
 Hedda Korsch
 Peter Suhrkamp

References

Bibliography

Further reading 

 
 

Schools in Thuringia
Buildings and structures in Saalfeld-Rudolstadt
Alternative schools
Educational institutions established in 1906
1906 establishments in Germany
Educational institutions disestablished in 1991
1991 disestablishments in Germany